The 2014 National People's Congress (formally, the Second Session of the 12th National People's Congress) held its annual meeting in March 2014 at the Great Hall of the People in Beijing, China. The session opened on 5 March and concluded on 13 March.

Government Work Report
Below are the key points of the country's achievements in the past year, from Premier Li Keqiang's work report:

The economy was stable and improved. The gross domestic product (GDP) reached 56.9 trillion yuan, an increase of 7.7% over the previous year. The rise in the consumer price index (CPI) was kept at 2.6%. The registered urban unemployment rate was kept at 4.1% and 13.1 million urban jobs were created, an all-time high. Total imports and exports exceeded US$4 trillion, reaching a new high.
Personal income continued to rise, and economic performance continued to improve. The per capita disposable income of urban residents rose by 7% in real terms, and the per capita net income of rural residents rose by 9.3% in real terms. The number of rural people living in poverty was reduced by 16.5 million and the urban-rural income gap continued to narrow. The profits of industrial enterprises with annual revenue of 20 million yuan or more from their main business operations rose by 12.2%. Government revenue increased by 10.1%.
Progress was achieved in adjusting the economic structure. Grain output exceeded 600 million metric tons, increasing for the tenth consecutive year. The value-added of the service sector accounted for 46.1% of GDP, surpassing secondary industry for the first time. The proportion of the gross regional product of the central and western regions to China's GDP continued to rise, and development in different regions became better balanced. China's total electricity consumption increased by 7.5%, and the volume of freight transport rose by 9.9%. Main real physical indexes matched economic growth.
Social programs developed vigorously. Progress was made in education, science and technology, culture, and health. The Shenzhou-10 spacecraft was sent into orbit. The Chang'e-3 lunar lander successfully landed on the moon. The submersible Jiaolong broke the record for manned deep-sea dives. All this shows that the Chinese people definitely have the ability and wisdom to achieve the objective of making the country more innovative

The work report also included requirements for the government's work for the coming year, the main points were:

withhold socialism with Chinese characteristics; take Deng Xiaoping Theory, the important thought of Three Represents and the Scientific Outlook on Development as our guide; comprehensively implement the guidelines of the Eighteenth National Party Congress and the second and third plenary sessions of the Eighteenth CPC Central Committee
comprehensively implement the guidelines of the Eighteenth National Party Congress and the second and third plenary sessions of the Eighteenth CPC Central Committee
carry out reform and innovation in all areas of economic and social development
implement the guiding principles of Xi Jinping's speeches
adhere to the general work guideline of making progress while maintaining stability
carry out reform and innovation in all areas of economic and social development
maintain continuity and stability of our macroeconomic policies
make macro-control more forward-oriented and targeted
constantly expand opening up; drive development through innovation
keep to the new path of industrialization, IT application, urbanization and agricultural modernization with distinctive Chinese features
accelerate transformation of the growth model, structural adjustments, and industrial upgrading
strengthen the development of the basic public service system
raise the quality and returns of development
promote socialist economic, political, cultural, social, and ecological advancement

The last part of the report consists of targets for the coming year, the main points are:

increase GDP by about 7.5%
keep the rise in the CPI at around 3.5%
create ten million more urban jobs
ensure that the registered urban unemployment rate does not rise above 4.6%
achieve basic balance in international payments, and increase personal income in step with economic development

References

External links
NPC Official Website

National People's Congresses
2014 in China